Tenavatähti (Finnish for "kid star") was a Finnish television singing competition for children.

Famous contestants 
 Konsta Hietanen, footballer
 Karoliina Kallio, singer
 Sofia Sida, singer

References

External links 
 

Finnish television shows
Singing talent shows
1990 Finnish television series debuts
1995 Finnish television series endings
Yle original programming
Finnish non-fiction television series